This is a list of the best selling singles, albums and as according to IRMA. Further listings can be found here.

Top selling singles
"Womanizer" - Britney Spears
"Circus" - Britney Spears 
"Low" - Flo Rida feat. T-Pain
"Now You're Gone" - Basshunter & DJ Mental Theo's Bazzheadz
"I Kissed a Girl" - Katy Perry
"All Summer Long" - Kid Rock
"Rockstar" - Nickelback
"Take a Bow" - Rihanna
"American Boy"-Estelle feat. Kanye West
"If U Seek Amy" -Britney Spears

Top selling albums
Circus - Britney Spears
The Script (album) - The ScriptSpirit - Leona LewisThe Circus - Take ThatThe Priests - The PriestsViva La Vida or Death and All His Friends - ColdplayGood Girl Gone Bad - RihannaMamma Mia! The Movie Soundtrack - Mamma Mia! film castRockferry - DuffyBack to Black'' - Amy Winehouse

Notes:
 *Compilation albums are not included.

References

2008 in Irish music
Ireland top selling
2008